Nagihan Avanaş (born 23 May 1997) is a Turkish women's football forward, who plays in the Turkish Women's Football Super League for Fatih Karagümrğk S.K. in Istanbul with jersey number 21. She was member of the Turkey women's national U-17 team.

Personal life 
Nagihan Avanaş was born in Susuz district of Kars Province, Turkey on 23 May 1997.

Avanaş has spoken out about the difficulties that female Turkish footballers face, stating that they rarely get news coverage and many of them struggle financially. Outside of her football career, she is a physical education and sports teacher.

Club career 
thumb|Nagihan Avanaş (left) for Ataşehir Belediyespor challenging an attack of Gazikentspor in the 2014–15 League season's home match.

Nagihan Avanaş obtained her license for the Istanbul-based club Sosyal Hizmetler Gençlik ve Spor on 25 May 2011. After playing two seasons with Ovacık Gençlik ve Spor in Karabük, she transferred to Ataşehir Belediyespor in the 2013–14 season, where she still plays.

In 2014, she was part of the highschool team, which became champion at the ISF World Schools Futsal Championship held in Cagliari, Sardinia, Italy.

After staying away from the pitch in the 2016–17 season, she transferred to Kireçburnu Spor in October 2017. In the second half of the 2018*19 First League season, Avanaş returned to her former club Ataşehir Belediyespor.

In December 2021, Avanaş transferred to rge newly founded club Fatih Karagümrük S.K.

= International career 
On19 April 2012 Avanaş debuted in the Turkey girls' U-17 team playing against Azerbaijan in the U17 Women's win UEFA Development Cup.

Career statistics 
.

Honours 
 Turkish Women's Football Super League
 Fatih Karagümrük S.K.
 Runners-up (1): 2021-22

 Turkish Women's Football First League
 Ataşehir Belediyespor
 Runners-up (2): 2013–14, 2014–15

 ISF World Schools Futsal Championship
 Mevlana Vocational Highschool for Girls team
 Winners (1): 2014

References

External links

Living people
1997 births
People from Susuz
Turkish women's footballers
Ataşehir Belediyespor players
Women's association football forwards
Kireçburnu Spor players
Fatih Karagümrük S.K. (women's football) players